The 1560s BC was a decade lasting from January 1, 1569 BC to December 31, 1560 BC.

Events and trends
 1567 BC—Egypt: End of Fifteenth Dynasty, end of Sixteenth Dynasty, end of Seventeenth Dynasty, start of Eighteenth Dynasty.

Significant people
 Reuben, son of Jacob (1568–1445 BC).
 Ahmose I, Pharaoh and founder of the 18th Dynasty of Egypt (1570–1546 BC).

References